Jordan Pena (born May 21, 2000) is an American soccer player who plays as a midfielder for FC Tucson of USL League One.

Career 
On February 14, 2019, Pena signed for USL Championship side Real Monarchs, after previously playing with the Real Salt Lake academy.

On September 15, 2020, Pena joined USL League One side FC Tucson on loan for the remainder of the season.

His option was declined by Real Monarchs following the 2020 season. Pena was signed to a regular contract by FC Tucson on January 12, 2021.

Honors 
Real Monarchs
 USL Championship Cup: 2019

References 

2000 births
Living people
American soccer players
Association football midfielders
FC Tucson players
People from Payson, Utah
Real Monarchs players
Soccer players from Utah
USL Championship players
USL League One players